Ali Ja'far al-Allaq (1945) is an Iraqi poet, literary critic and academic. He graduated from the universities of Al-Mustansiriya in 1973, and Exeter in 1984. He held many administrative and academic positions, and wrote several collections of poetry and important critical studies, which had an important role in the modern Iraqi poetic movement.

Biography    
Ali Ja'far al-Allaq was born in Kut, Wasit in 1945. He completed his secondary education in Baghdad, received his BA in Arabic literature from Al-Mustansiriya University  in 1973, and doctorate in criticism and modern literature from the University of Exeter in Britain, 1984.

During his academic career, he worked as a teacher at Al-Mustansiriya University and Baghdad University from 1985 to 1991, Sana'a University 1991-1997, and United Arab Emirates University 1997-2015. He worked in literary journalism as an editor in the   Al-Aqdam al-Adabiyah  magazine since 1970, then worked as a secretary for the magazine Al-Aqdam in 1978, and  its editor-in-chief from 1984 to 1990. He has written many researches and critical articles in newspapers, in Arabic and English. He also served as Director of Theaters and Folklore for the Ministry of Culture in Iraq, 1976-1978. A member of The General Union of Arab Writers, the Union of Iraqi Writers and the Association of Literary Critics in Iraq, he has participated in many cultural and poetry festivals in Arab countries, Britain, the Soviet Union, Yugoslavia and Bulgaria.

Works 
A collection poetic works of Allaq were published in 1998 by Arab Institute for Research and Publishing in Beirut, then in 2014 in two volums by Dar Fada'at, Amman. Among his poetry collections, are:
 , 1973
 , 1975
 , 1979
 , 1987
 , 1993
 , 1999 
 , 2006
 , 2008
 , 2010
 , 2011
 , 2013.
 , 2013
 ,  2015
 , 2018
 , 2021
Literary criticism:
 , 1977
 , 1981
 , 1989
 , 1990
 , 1997
 , 2008
 ,2008
 , 2010
 , 2013
 ,  2013
 ,  2018
 ,  2020
Collaborative writings:
 , 1985
 , 1988
 , 1995
 , 1996
 , 1997
in English
 Poems, 1988
  Tradition and Modernity in Arabic Language and Literature, 1996
Others books:
 , autobiography, 2022

References 

1945 births
Al-Mustansiriya University alumni
Alumni of the University of Exeter
21st-century Iraqi poets
20th-century Iraqi poets
Iraqi literary critics
People from Kut
Academic staff of Al-Mustansiriya University
Academic staff of the University of Baghdad
Academic staff of Sanaa University
Academic staff of United Arab Emirates University
Iraqi expatriates in Yemen
Iraqi expatriates in the United Arab Emirates
20th-century Iraqi journalists
Iraqi essayists
Iraqi autobiographers
Living people